Kia Zolgharnain  (born November 10, 1965) is an Iranian-American soccer coach and former player who is the current head coach and technical director of Akron City FC. As a player, Zolgharnain was a forward who led the American Indoor Soccer Association in scoring during the 1986–1987 season.  He coaches youth soccer in Cleveland.  During his playing days, he was known by his first name alone.

Youth and high school
Although born in Iran, Zolgharnain's family fled the country after the 1978 Iranian Revolution.  They settled in Scottsdale, Arizona where Zolgharnain attended Coronado High School.  He became a U.S. citizen in 1994.

Playing

Professional
In 1983, Kia chose to turn professional coming out of high school. From 1983-2000 he scored 527 goals in 534 professional indoor appearances with the likes of the Phoenix Pride, Canton Invaders, Kansas City Comets, Tacoma Stars, Pittsburgh Stingers, and Cleveland Crunch.  He is best known for his success with the Invaders where he scored an astonishing 324 goals.

He signed with the Phoenix Pride of Major Indoor Soccer League (MISL).  In 1984, he moved to the expansion Canton Invaders of the American Indoor Soccer Association (AISA).  The Invaders won the 1985 and 1986 AISA championships as Zolgharnain was selected as a first team All Star both seasons.  In 1987, Kia returned to MISL, this time with the Kansas City Comets.  On December 23, 1989, the Comets traded Kia and Gerry Gray to the Tacoma Stars in exchange for Barry Wallace.  In 1991, Kia rejoined the Canton Invaders.  In 1995 and 1996, Kia spent two summer indoor seasons with the Pittsburgh Stingers in the Continental Indoor Soccer League.  In 1996, Kia signed with the Cleveland Crunch of the National Professional Soccer League (NPSL).  While he played thirty-seven games in the 1996–1997 season, his playing time rapidly dropped over the next three seasons.  In 1997–1998, he played only fifteen games.  That fell to one in 1998–1999 and three at the beginning of the 1999–2000 season.  The Crunch waived him on December 3, 1999.  Zolgharnain finished his career ranked ninth on the AISA/NPSL goals list.  He was also a two time first team All Star.

Futsal
Zolgharnain earned five caps, scoring two goals, with the U.S. Futsal team in 1995.  That year, the U.S. finished fourth in the Futsal Mundialito.

Coaching
Zolgharnain has been coaching at the youth soccer level since 1984. He began as a coach in the Ohio Olympic Developmental Program. After retiring from playing, he became an assistant coach with the Cleveland Crunch. In 2001, he spent a season as an assistant coach at John Carroll University. He then joined the Cleveland Soccer Academy as the Director of Coaching, a position he held from 2001 to 2005. In 2003, he became a Super Y-League coach with the Cleveland Crunch Juniors.  The team won the 2003 U-19 Super Y National Championship.  In November 2005, he left Cleveland and moved to Georgia where he became the Director of Coaching for the Peachtree City Youth Soccer Association.  In 2007, he returned to Cleveland as the Director of Coaching for CASA (Cleveland Alliance Soccer Association) U16 & U18 USSF developmental Academy. In 2019 Kia created the soccer training and consulting firm Go2Goal. Go2Goal provides independent training sessions for youth of all ages in Northeast Ohio. Along with their independent training program, Go2Goal also has secured multi year contracts to oversee the development of the Chagrin Falls and Solon Soccer Club community travel programs. Chagrin Falls and Solon Soccer Club are considered two of the best community travel programs in Northeast Ohio and have continued to flourish under Kia's leadership. In the fall of 2020, Kia founded a new premier club program called Sporting Chagrin Valley Football Academy.  Kia has partnered with seasoned sports industry executive Nick Turchan and local businessmen Robert Cohn and Jason Fisher in this venture.  The academy has increased its enrollment to 170 players (2022–23), up from 40 its first year (2020–21) and is considered one of the best training grounds for youth soccer players in Northeast Ohio.

Business
In addition to playing and coaching soccer, Zolgharnain has owned several businesses including a chain of sporting goods stores in Pittsburgh, Pennsylvania.

References

External links
 Career stats

1965 births
Living people
American men's futsal players
American Indoor Soccer Association players
American soccer coaches
American soccer players
Canton Invaders (AISA) players
Canton Invaders (NPSL) players
Cleveland Crunch (NPSL) players
Continental Indoor Soccer League players
Association football forwards
Kansas City Comets (original MISL) players
Iranian expatriate footballers
Iranian footballers
Iranian emigrants to the United States
Major Indoor Soccer League (1978–1992) players
National Professional Soccer League (1984–2001) players
Sportspeople from Mashhad
Sportspeople of Iranian descent
Phoenix Pride players
Pittsburgh Stingers players
Soccer players from Scottsdale, Arizona
Tacoma Stars players